Live at the Budokan is a two-disc live album by British band Blur, recorded during the 1995 tour for their album The Great Escape, at the Budokan on 8 November 1995. Two songs performed at concert that didn't make the cut for the album can be found on the Japanese single, "It Could Be You": "Charmless Man" (originally performed before "Jubilee") and "Chemical World" (originally performed before "Coping"). The version of "She's So High" is an anomaly, as it is actually the 9 November 1995 performance from the NHK Hall in Tokyo. Until 2009, Live at Budokan was the only official standalone live Blur album. It was originally released only in Japan (or via the band's UK fan club), but has since been released internationally.

Track listing

Disc one
"The Great Escape" – 1:37
"Jubilee" – 3:13
"Popscene" – 3:11
"End of a Century" – 2:56
"Tracy Jacks" – 4:09
"Mr. Robinson's Quango" – 5:02
"To the End" – 4:18
"Fade Away" – 4:20
"It Could Be You" – 3:13
"Stereotypes" – 3:29
"She's So High" – 5:26
"Girls & Boys" – 4:50
"Advert" – 3:28
"Intermission" – 1:39
"Bank Holiday" – 1:51
"For Tomorrow" – 6:26
"Country House" – 4:40
"This Is a Low" – 5:12
"Supa Shoppa" – 3:23

Disc two
"Yuko and Hiro" – 4:44
"He Thought of Cars" – 5:03
"Coping" – 3:23
"Globe Alone" – 2:43
"Parklife" – 3:37
"The Universal" – 5:11

References

External links
 

Blur (band) albums
1996 live albums
Albums recorded at the Nippon Budokan